Sekonaia Kalou (born April 6, 1984) is a Fijian professional rugby union player who is also known by the name Sekonaia Qaranaqio. He has also represented Fiji at Netball.

Rugby career

Club career
Sekonaia played lock for the Kaikorai Rugby Football Club and for Otago in the ITM Cup. He has also played for the 2nd Division New Zealand club North Otago with whom he won the Heartland Championship playing alongside fellow Fijian players Viliame Veikoso, Noa Soqeta and Waitisoni Lotawa. After playing for North Otago he made his way into the 1st Division team Otago in 2007.  He also played professionally for US Bressane in France and for Rugby Calvisano in Italy where he won an Eccellenza.  After he left Italy in 2015 he returned to Fiji to captain the Nadroga Stallions in Fiji's 2016 Skipper Cup.  In 2017 he was on the move again joining Waverley Harvesting Border in New Zealand club rugby.

International Rugby
His final international was against  at Twickenham.

Personal life

His brother is fellow professional rugby player Api Ratuniyarawa.

As well as rugby Kalou has also represented Fiji in Archery and Men's Netball.  In 2016 Kalou was named as Fiji's netball player of the year.

References

1984 births
Living people
Fijian rugby union players
North Otago rugby union players
Fijian expatriate rugby union players
Expatriate rugby union players in New Zealand
Fijian expatriate sportspeople in New Zealand
I-Taukei Fijian people
People from Sigatoka
Fiji international rugby union players
People educated at Suva Grammar School
Rugby union flankers
Rugby union locks